Boxing competed as one of the eight sports at the 2017 Commonwealth Youth Games in the Bahamas from July 18 to 23, 2017, in the Sir Kendal G. L. Isaacs Gymnasium, Nassau. In the Games, the age limit for participating athletes has been set according to the youth category of the International Boxing Association, which is 16–18 years, means athletes born in 1999 or 2000 are only eligible to take part.

Medal summary

Boys

Girls

Results

Boys - Light flyweight

Boys - Flyweight

Boys - Bantamweight

Boys - Lightweight

Boys - Light welterweight

Boys - Welterweight

Boys - Middleweight

Boys - Light heavyweight

Girls - Flyweight

Girls - Lightweight

Girls - Middleweight

References

External links

2017 in boxing
2017 Commonwealth Youth Games events